Benjamin Joseph Gamel (born May 17, 1992) is an American professional baseball outfielder in the Tampa Bay Rays organization. He has played in Major League Baseball (MLB) for the New York Yankees, Seattle Mariners, Milwaukee Brewers, Cleveland Indians, and Pittsburgh Pirates.

Career

Early life 
Gamel attended Bishop Kenny High School in Jacksonville, Florida. He committed to play college baseball at Florida State University.

New York Yankees
The New York Yankees selected Gamel in the 10th round of the 2010 Major League Baseball draft. He signed with the Yankees and made his professional debut with the Gulf Coast Yankees of the Rookie-level Gulf Coast League. He played in 2011 for the Staten Island Yankees of the Class A-Short Season New York-Penn League and in 2012 with the Charleston RiverDogs of the Class A South Atlantic League. He began the 2013 season with the Tampa Yankees of the Class A-Advanced Florida State League before being promoted to the Trenton Thunder of the Class AA Eastern League. He returned to Trenton in 2014 and played for the Scranton/Wilkes-Barre RailRiders of the Class AAA International League in 2015. The Yankees added him to their 40-man roster after the 2015 season.

After attending spring training, Gamel began the 2016 season with Scranton/Wilkes-Barre. The Yankees promoted Gamel to the major leagues on May 5, and he made his major league debut as a defensive replacement on May 6. He spent the majority of the 2016 season with Scranton/Wilkes-Barre, and won the International League Most Valuable Player Award.

Seattle Mariners
On August 31, 2016, the Seattle Mariners acquired Gamel from the Yankees for minor league pitchers Jio Orozco and Juan De Paula. In 2017, Gamel played in 134 contests for Seattle, slashing .275/.322/.413 with 11 home runs and 59 RBI over 509 at-bats. Gamel hit .272/.358/.370 with one homer and 19 RBI over 257 at-bats in 101 games for the Mariners in 2018.

Milwaukee Brewers
On December 21, 2018, the Mariners traded Gamel and Noah Zavolas to the Milwaukee Brewers for Domingo Santana. Gamel played in 134 games for the Brewers in 2019, slashing .248/.337/.373 with 7 home runs and 33 RBI over 311 at-bats. In 2020, Gamel appeared in 40 contests, hitting .237/.315/.404 with 3 home runs and 10 RBI in 114 at-bats. On December 2, 2020 Gamel was non tendered by the Brewers, making him a free agent.

Cleveland Indians
On February 11, 2021, Gamel signed a minor league contract with the Cleveland Indians organization that included an invitation to Spring Training. The Indians selected Gamel's contract on March 27, 2021. Gamel was designated for assignment on May 5, 2021.

Pittsburgh Pirates
On May 9, 2021, Gamel was claimed off waivers by the Pittsburgh Pirates. In 111 games for the Pirates, Gamel batted .255/.352/.399 with 8 home runs and 26 RBI.

Tampa Bay Rays
On February 22, 2023, Gamel signed a minor league contract with the Tampa Bay Rays organization.

Personal life
His brother, Mat Gamel played Major League Baseball for the Milwaukee Brewers. Gamel and his wife Lauren had their first child, a daughter, in March 2022.

References

External links

1992 births
Living people
Baseball players from Jacksonville, Florida
Bishop Kenny High School alumni
Charleston RiverDogs players
Cleveland Indians players
Gulf Coast Yankees players
Leones del Caracas players
American expatriate baseball players in Venezuela
Major League Baseball outfielders
Milwaukee Brewers players
Modesto Nuts players
New York Yankees players
Pittsburgh Pirates players
Scranton/Wilkes-Barre RailRiders players
Seattle Mariners players
Staten Island Yankees players
Tacoma Rainiers players
Tampa Yankees players
Trenton Thunder players